Eumetriochroa araliella is a moth of the family Gracillariidae. It is found in Mie, Nara, Fukuoka, Kagoshima (Amami Islands) prefectures, Japan.

The wingspan is 5–8.1 mm. The forewings are white with dark greyish-brown oblique streaks. The hindwings are whitish grey or grey. There are two to three generations per year.

The larvae feed on Dendropanax trifidus, Evodiopanax innovans, Eleutherococcus sciadophylloides and Fatsia japonica. They mine the leaves of their host plant. The mine has the form of a narrow, long serpentine mine. Usually, there are one to three mines per leaf. Larvae emerge from July to November.

Etymology
The name is derived from Araliaceae, the name of the family of the host plants.

References

Moths described in 2013
Phyllocnistinae
Moths of Japan